The Nansha Bridge (simplified Chinese: 南沙大桥; traditional Chinese: 南沙大橋; pinyin: Nánshā Dàqiáo) are two suspension bridges located in Guangdong, China, spanning the Pearl River. It is also the beginning of the Guangzhou–Longchuan Expressway. The bridge is an important part of the Pearl River Delta expressway network, connecting the Shatian Town in Dongguan to Nansha District in Guangzhou, as well as the Guangzhou Ring Expressway and the Guangshen Yanjiang Expressway.

While it was under construction it was due to be named the Humen Second Bridge (Chinese : 虎门二桥)

The Nansha Bridge opened to traffic on April 2, 2019.

See also
 List of bridges in China
 List of longest suspension bridge spans

References

Bridges completed in 2019
Bridges in Guangzhou
Road bridges in China
Expressways in Guangdong